The 1982 All-Pro Team is composed of the National Football League (NFL) players that were named to the Associated Press, Newspaper Enterprise Association, Pro Football Writers Association,  and Pro Football Weekly  in 1982. Both first- and second- teams are listed for the AP and NEA teams. These are the four teams that are included in Total Football II: The Official Encyclopedia of the National Football League.  The Sporting News did not choose a 1982 All-Pro team due to the players' strike.

Teams

Key
 AP = Associated Press first-team All-Pro
 AP-2 = Associated Press second-team All-Pro
 NEA = Newspaper Enterprise Association first-team All-Pro team
 NEA-2 = Newspaper Enterprise Association second-team All-Pro team
 PFW = Pro Football Weekly All-Pro team
 PFWA = Pro Football Writers Association All-NFL

References
Pro-Football-Reference.com

All-Pro Teams
Allpro